Yokthai Sithoar (born December 25, 1974) is a retired Thai professional boxer who held the WBA super flyweight (115 lb) world champion in the late 90s. He is also retired Muay Thai kickboxer and mixed martial artist (MMA).

Biography and career
He was born in Chonburi province, eastern Thailand, along his brother Tappaya Sit-Or and his nepehew Rambaa Somdet he trained in Muay Thai since childhood. They later became prominent and successful Muay Thai kickboxers.

Yokthai, became a famous Muay Thai fighter under Songchai Rattanasuban's stable. Known for the power of his punches, he often defeated his opponenets by knock out. He received the nickname "ไอ้หมัดไซโคลนนรก" (Ai-Mud-Cyclone-Na-Rok; lit: "Fist of the Hell Cyclone") from Muay Thai fans.

Because his fists were effective. He was backed by his promoter Songchai, to turn to professional boxing career in 1994 along with Pichit Chor Siriwat in the junior flyweight division with Cuba's Ismael Salas as a trainer. He had four wins and won the vacant PABA super flyweight title against a Russian boxe. He won his next five bouts including three title defenses.

On August 24, 1996 Yokthai challenged for the WBA super flyweight world title against Venezuelan title holder Alimi Goitia in the Kamphaengphet Provincial Stadium, Kamphaeng Phet province, he won by TKO in the eighth round. He became the second Thai who capture WBA super flyweight world title after the legendary Khaosai Galaxy.

He would defend his title at four times, defeating famous boxers, such as Aquiles Guzmán and Jesús Kiki Rojas. He later traveled to Japan where he lost the title to Satoshi Iida a Japanese boxer, an old rival who he drew with in the past, by unanimous decision at the Aichi Prefectural Gymnasium in Nagoya on December 23, 1997. He returned to challenge for a world title again on April 23, 2000 against the new title holder Hideki Todaka at Rainbow Hall, Nagoya. He was defeated by TKO in the 11th round.

He continued to fight several times but was not as successful. He retired from professional boxing in mid-2004.

After retiring Yokthai moved to Japan to work as a Muay Thai trainer in Sendai, Miyagi Prefecture where had his own Muay Thai gym. While in Japan he went back to competition in 2008. He married a Japanese MMA fighter, Hikaru Shinohara. Yokthai competed in his lone mixed martial arts match against Shinya Aoki in 2010, where he lost via first-round submission.

Titles & honours

Muay Thai
Lumpinee Stadium
 1994 Lumpinee Stadium 115 lbs Champion

Boxing
Pan Asian Boxing Association
 1995 PABA Flyweight Champion (three defenses)
World Boxing Association
 1996 WBA World Super Flyweight Champion (four defenses)

Boxing record

Muay Thai record

|- style="text-align:center; background:#fbb;"
| 2009-07-05 || Loss ||align=left| Keichi Nakajima||DEEP☆KICK|| Osaka, Japan || KO (Left hook to the body) || 2 || 0:28

|- style="text-align:center; background:#fbb;"
| 2008-11-24 || Loss ||align=left| Yuji Takeuchi || MAJKF - Tekken 6 || Tokyo, Japan || Decision (Unanimous) || 5 || 3:00

|- style="text-align:center; background:#cfc;"
| 1994-08-27 || Win ||align=left| Nungubon Sitlerchai  || Lumpinee Stadium || Bangkok, Thailand || Decision || 5 || 3:00

|- style="text-align:center; background:#cfc;"
| 1994-08-09 || Win ||align=left| Nungubon Sitlerchai  || Lumpinee Stadium || Bangkok, Thailand || Decision || 5 || 3:00

|- style="text-align:center; background:#cfc;"
| 1994-07-19 || Win||align=left| Nongnarong Luksamrong  || Lumpinee Stadium|| Bangkok, Thailand || KO (Punches) || 3 || 
|-
! style=background:white colspan=9 |

|- style="text-align:center; background:#fbb;"
| 1994-06-10 || Loss||align=left| Nongnarong Luksamrong  || Lumpinee Stadium|| Bangkok, Thailand || Decision || 5 || 3:00
|-
! style=background:white colspan=9 |

|- style="text-align:center; background:#cfc;"
| 1994-05-03 || Win ||align=left| Lamnamoon Sor.Sumalee || Lumpinee Stadium ||  Bangkok, Thailand  || KO (Punches)|| 2 ||

|- style="text-align:center; background:#cfc;"
| 1994-03-25 || Win ||align=left| Kaoponglek Luksuratham || Lumpinee Stadium || Bangkok, Thailand || KO (Punches)  || 2 ||

|- style="text-align:center; background:#cfc;"
| 1994-02-15 || Win ||align=left| Sangmorakot Sor.Ploenchit  || Lumpinee Stadium|| Bangkok, Thailand || TKO || 4 ||

|- style="text-align:center; background:#fbb;"
| 1994-01-28 || Loss||align=left| Meechok Sor.Ploenchit  || Lumpinee Stadium|| Bangkok, Thailand || Decision || 5 || 3:00

|- style="text-align:center; background:#cfc;"
| 1994-01-01 || Win ||align=left| Rittidet Kierdpayak  || Lumpinee Stadium|| Bangkok, Thailand || TKO (Punches) || 3 ||

|- style="text-align:center; background:#fbb;"
| 1993-11-06 || Loss||align=left| Denaree Dechphonthip  || Lumpinee Stadium|| Bangkok, Thailand || Decision || 5 || 3:00

|- style="text-align:center; background:#fbb;"
| 1993-05-15 || Loss||align=left| Charoenwit Kiatbanchong  || Lumpinee Stadium|| Bangkok, Thailand || Decision || 5 || 3:00

|- style="text-align:center; background:#fbb;"
| 1992-11-20 || Loss||align=left| Dokmaifai Tor.Sitthichai  ||Lumpinee Stadium || Bangkok, Thailand || Decision || 5 || 3:00

|- style="text-align:center; background:#fbb;"
| 1991-08-06 || Loss||align=left| Thanongsak Sor.Prantalay  || Lumpinee Stadium|| Bangkok, Thailand || Decision || 5 || 3:00

|- style="text-align:center; background:#cfc;"
| 1990-10-12 || Win ||align=left| Kehars Chuchokchai || Lumpinee Stadium|| Bangkok, Thailand || Decision || 5 || 3:00

|- style="text-align:center; background:#cfc;"
| 1990-07-10 || Win ||align=left| Rungrawee Sakwichian  || Lumpinee Stadium|| Bangkok, Thailand || Decision || 5 || 3:00

|-
| colspan=8 | Legend:

Mixed martial arts record

|-
| Loss
| align=center| 0–1
| Shinya Aoki
| Submission (keylock)
| DEEP: 50 Impact 
| 
| align=center| 1
| align=center| 1:00
| Tokyo, Japan
|

References

External links 
 

Living people
1974 births
Super-flyweight boxers
Yokthai Sithoar
Yokthai Sithoar
Yokthai Sithoar
Muay Thai trainers
World Boxing Association champions
Yokthai Sithoar
Featherweight mixed martial artists
Mixed martial artists utilizing boxing
Mixed martial artists utilizing Muay Thai
Thai expatriate sportspeople in Japan